Gunnar Sandberg (born 1966) is a Swedish social democratic politician, member of the Riksdag since 2003.

References

Members of the Riksdag from the Social Democrats
Living people
1966 births
Members of the Riksdag 2002–2006
Place of birth missing (living people)
Date of birth missing (living people)